Fighting Fifth is a may refer to:
Royal Northumberland Fusiliers a former regiment of the British Army
Fighting Fifth Hurdle, a hurdling horse race in the United Kingdom named for the regiment.
5th Arkansas Infantry, a Confederate States Army infantry unit
5th Marine Regiment, a United States Marine Corps infantry unit
Zone Five of the Pittsburgh Police